Brahmangaon is a village situated in Kanaksar village in Lowhajanj Upozila of Bikrampur, now Munshiganj district in the central Bangladesh.

References

Populated places in Barisal District